Wilbur Harold Schumacher (March 6, 1920 – September 3, 1971) was an American professional basketball player. He played for the Indianapolis Kautskys in the National Basketball League for five games during the 1945–46 season and averaged 2.0 points per game.

References

1920 births
1971 deaths
American men's basketball players
American military personnel of World War II
Basketball players from Louisville, Kentucky
Butler Bulldogs men's basketball players
Forwards (basketball)
Indianapolis Kautskys players